The 1961–62 Liga Bet season saw Hapoel Safed,  Hapoel Hadera, Hapoel Lod and Hapoel Holon promoted to Liga Alef as the respective winners of their regional divisions.

North Division A

North Division B

South Division A

South Division B

References
Liga Bet tables Heruth, 19.6.62, Historical Jewish Press 
Further complications in Liga Bet Maariv, 16.4.62, Historical Jewish Press 

Liga Bet seasons
Israel
3